Tree Roots is an oil painting by Vincent van Gogh that he painted in July 1890 when he lived in Auvers-sur-Oise, France.  The painting is an example of the double-square canvases that he employed in his last landscapes.

Background 

Van Gogh spent the last few months of his life in Auvers-sur-Oise, a small town just north of Paris, after he left an asylum at Saint-Rémy in May 1890. The painting is considered by some to be his last painting before his death late July 1890.

Jan Hulsker considers it the most original of his double-square canvases. The viewer thinks he can identify tree roots and trunks, but is hard put to identify the subject as a whole. Van der Veen and Knapp comment that in this painting, as also in Undergrowth with Two Figures, the painting itself and not the subject is pre-eminent, heralding abstract painting and German expressionism.

In 1882, while at The Hague, van Gogh had made a study of tree roots, Study of a Tree (below), which he had completed at the same time as a larger version (now lost) of Sorrow. In a letter to his brother Theo, van Gogh said that he wanted to express something of life's struggle in these drawings. It is not known whether he had returned to the same thoughts with his 1890 Tree Roots. The letters give no hint and the colours are perhaps too bright for such sombre thoughts.

In 2020, researchers at the Institut Van Gogh and the Van Gogh Museum determined the likely location where the painting was made, based on an historical postcard, to be on the rue Daubigny in Auvers-sur-Oise. The location is about 150 metres from Auberge Ravoux, Van Gogh's hotel at the time.

See also
List of works by Vincent van Gogh

Works

Letters

References

Bibliography
 de la Faille, Jacob-Baart. The Works of Vincent van Gogh: His Paintings and Drawings. Amsterdam: Meulenhoff, 1970. 
 Hulsker, Jan. The Complete Van Gogh. Oxford: Phaidon, 1980. 
 Naifeh, Steven; Smith, Gregory White. Van Gogh: The Life. Profile Books, 2011. 
 van der Veen, Wouter; Knapp, Peter. Van Gogh in Auvers: His Last Days. Monacelli Press, 2010.

External links 
 Tree Roots at the Van Gogh Museum website

Paintings by Vincent van Gogh
Paintings of Auvers-sur-Oise by Vincent van Gogh
1890 paintings
Collections of the Van Gogh Museum